This article contains the lift launch systems constructed by some solid fuel stages except the final stage.

All stages solid fueled 

* Including suborbital mission

All stages solid fueled except uppermost stage

See also

 Comparison of orbital rocket engines
 Comparison of orbital launch systems
 Comparison of orbital launchers families
 Comparison of orbital spacecraft
 Comparison of space station cargo vehicles
 List of space launch system designs
 List of orbital launch systems

References

Space lists

Technological comparisons